Timothy Williams (born 1946) is a bilingual British author who has written six novels in English featuring Commissario Piero Trotti, a character critics have referred to as a personification of modern Italy. Williams' books include Black August, which won a Crime Writers' Association award. His novels have been translated into French, Italian, Danish, Russian, Bulgarian, Polish, and Japanese.

Williams' first French novel, Un autre soleil, set in the Caribbean island of Guadeloupe, was published in Paris by Rivages in March 2011 and was published in English in New York City in April 2013 as Another Sun.

Williams was born in Walthamstow (Essex, now London) and attended Woodford Green Preparatory School,  Chigwell School and St Andrews University. He has previously lived in France, Italy, and in Romania, where he worked for the British Council.

Williams is among the small number of authors writing Italian crime novels in English (including Magdalen Nabb, Michael Dibdin, and Donna Leon), three of whom are British and were born in the span of a single year. Ms. Nabb's Death of an Englishman was published in 1981 and Williams' Converging Parallels followed in 1982. Williams is also the author of a series of crime novels set in Guadeloupe in the French West Indies featuring Anne Marie Laveaud, a juge d'instruction. Mr. Williams, who holds dual British/French citizenship, currently lives on the island of Guadeloupe and teaches in the main lycée of Pointe à Pitre.

For the Observer Timothy Williams is one of the ten best European crime novelists. "The five books in Williams’s Commissario Trotti series, written from 1982–96, are hard to find, but if you liked Zen (Dibdin’s books or the TV series) you’ll enjoy Trotti just as much. A delight."

The Italian Novels 

The first five Trotti novels were originally published by Gollancz in London. They are now available in paperback edition from Soho Publishing. The sixth novel, The Second Day of the Renaissance, was published by Soho Publishing in May 2017.

Cultural milieu
Commissario Trotti investigates crime in a small, unnamed city on the river Po in the north of Italy (sometimes erroneously identified as Padua, but more close to Pavia, at least for "Converging Parallels"). Trotti's career spans much of the First Republic, from the period known as the Italian Miracle through the Anni di Piombo. This milieu keeps the Polizia di Stato busy and in his enquiries Trotti frequently confronts problems facing Italian society: terrorism, political instability, corruption, socialism under Craxi, Operation Clean Hands (mani pulite), and above all, the decline of civilised intercourse.

Writing in a minimalist style, in which he relies largely on dialogue to advance the plot, Williams has at times been considered a demanding author. One critic complained that the books read like translations from Italian. Some readers find that pace and tension are sacrificed for sociology and politics and that the moody, brooding Trotti, addicted to rhubarb sweets, is too slow and too wordy for their taste.

Characterization
The novels are populated with an array of acquaintances, colleagues, criminals, and the occasional walk-on, which together present a spectrum of the Italian national character. The author often uses minor characters to demonstrate the Italian penchant for labyrinthine and sometimes obfuscatory dialogue.

Having grown up under Fascism and having lost a brother in the partisan war of 1943-45, Piero Trotti is cynical yet dourly optimistic. By the fifth novel this optimism is in scant evidence. Trotti's estranged wife lives in America. A number of women find Trotti appealing but Trotti is torn in his loyalty to the marriage.

The primary characters, Trotti and the two subalterns with whom he works, employ a more restrained, direct discourse. Trotti himself is not expressive and seems impervious to personal relationships, but both lieutenants form close bonds with their demanding mentor. Magagna eventually leaves for Milan, in part to escape Trotti's overwhelming influence. Pisanelli, who replaces Magagna as Trotti's foil, is unable to remove himself from Trotti's orbit and comes to both admire and resent his superior.

In the early novels Trotti's daughter Pioppi suffers from anorexia, a fact which continues to haunt Trotti for years, long after her recovery, and causes him to question his role as a father. In the later novels, Trotti is a grandfather to two little girls who give meaning to his life.

The Guadeloupe Novels 

There are two novels with protagonist Anne-Marie Laveaud, an investigative magistrate based in Pointe-à-Pitre in the French island of Guadeloupe.

Anne-Marie Laveaud
In 2012 Rivages Noir published Un autre soleil, a crime novel set in the island département of Guadeloupe, in the French Caribbean. In 2013, the book was published by Soho Crime. 
In 1980, the ex-convict, Hegesippe Bray, returning home after forty years spent in the penal colony of Cayenne, has been charged with the murder of a white landowner who was running him off his property. Nine months before the French presidential elections of 1981, for political reasons, the authorities wish to view the murder as an open-and-shut case of revenge killing. Anne Marie Laveaud, the juge d'instruction (investigative magistrate) in charge of the case, does not agree. To learn the truth, she will put herself, her career and her family in jeopardy.

Novels
The Inspector Trotti Novels
Converging Parallels (London: Gollancz, 1982)(New York: Soho Press, 2014)
The Puppeteer (London: Gollancz, 1985)
Persona Non Grata (London: Gollancz, 1987)
Black August (London: Orion, 1992)
Big Italy (London: Orion, 1996)
The Second Day of the Renaissance (New York: Soho, 2017)

The Anne Marie Laveaud Novels
Another Sun (New York: Soho, 2013)
The Honest Folk of Guadeloupe (New York: Soho, 2014)

in French
 Un autre soleil (Paris Rivages 2011)

References

External links
Timothy Williams
Tangled Web
Italian Mysteries

English crime fiction writers
Organized crime novelists
Alumni of the University of St Andrews
1946 births
Living people